Shahid Soltani School is a NODET (National Organization for Development of Exceptional Talents, also known as SAMPAD) School for talented students in Karaj, Alborz Province, Iran. Shahid Soltani is among nationwide schools developed specifically to provide a superior education for exceptionally talented students in Iran, and are managed by the National Organization for Development of Exceptional Talents. Students are selected through a citywide entrance exam that is designed to measure intelligence. Students study subjects in depth, similar to college courses.

The school occupies an area of 4430 square meters. Its first headmaster was Sahabali Fazli.  The second headmaster is Amirabd-allah Eshagi.

Shahid Soltani Currently hosts an exhibit of students' discoveries and inventions named Huger that is in the last week of every year and it is completely controlled and managed by students.

History 
The school is named after Gholamreza Soltani.

The school was founded on 17 October 1990 at 45.m Mehr-shahr Street in a house.  After 4 years the school moved to Heydar-abad, south of Shahin-villa, and the next year it moved to Shahed St. Motahari Ave. Azadegan Sq.

Notable alumni 
 Alireza Salehi Golsefidy, winner of gold medal of national and silver medal of international olympiad of mathematics (1997)
 Ali Andaji, winner of national gold medal of computer olympiad (1997) 
 Seyed Vahab-addin Mir rokni, winner of national gold medal of computer olympiad (1998) 
 Peyman Farsi, second place of university entrance exam (1998)
 Jaber Zarezadeh, winner of gold medal of national and international olympiad of mathematics (2006)
Reza Mokhtari, Third place in the ninth season of Khwarizmi youth festival (2007)
 Saeed Ilchi, winner of gold medal of national and International Olympiad of Informatics (2012)
 Amir zare, winner of international gold medal of physics olympiad (2013)
 Sajad Sadeghizade, first place of university entrance exam (2013)
 Mohammad Ali Sharpasand, first place of International RoboCup Iran-Open 
 seyed mahdi Alavi, first place of international robotic competition at Sharif University of Technology
 Aref Moqadam Mehr, first place of International RoboCup Iran-Open (2012, 2013, 2014)
 Arshia Alaiee, Certification of Award For Silver Medal For the Invention Of International Invention Innovation Competition In Canada (ICAN) - August 2017

References

External links
 / Official website
 National Organization for Development of Exceptional Talents
 Students forum

Selective schools
Gifted education
Educational organisations based in Iran
Schools in Iran
National Organization for Development of Exceptional Talents
Educational institutions established in 1990
1990 establishments in Iran
Karaj